Ronald "Ron" D. Boire is an American businessman. He has served as an executive for several companies, including Sony Electronics, Best Buy and CEO roles with Barnes & Noble, Brookstone, Sears Canada.

Early life and career
Ron Boire grew up on a farm in upstate New York, where he helped out on the family property for $2/hour. Money was tight and hardcover books were a rare luxury.

Boire got his start in sales at Sony Electronics, where he worked for seventeen years, during which time he was President of the Personal Mobile Products Company, President of the Consumer Sales Company, and a member of the Sony Electronics Executive Committee. Boire obtained MBAs from Columbia University and the London Business School in 2003. After graduation, Boire worked at Best Buy until 2006, serving on the Best Buy Executive Committee and as Executive Vice President, Global General Merchandise Manager. Boire then joined Toys R Us. While at Toys "R" Us, Boire held positions as President, "R" Us Brands, President, Toys "R" Us, North America, Toys "R" Us .com and Toys "R" Us Canada. The team at Toys R Us was credited with executing a transformative turnaround while Boire was President.  Boire was also an instrumental figure in a testing program that detected lead paint in toys imported from China, helping to preserve trust in toys licensed by brands such as Disney to third party manufacturers.

In October 2009, Boire joined Brookstone as President and CEO.   He became President, Sears and Kmart Formats and Chief Merchandising Officer for Sears and Kmart in 2012.

He was the President and CEO of Sears Canada from October 2014 to August 2015 and director at Retail Council of Canada. Boire became CEO of Barnes & Noble in September 2015.

Personal life and interests
Boire married Faith Ferguson, a meeting and events planner based in Warwick, New York in 2010. The couple are co-founders of the Ferguson-Noonan Foundation, a 501(c)(3) corporation providing educational support to young people.

In 2014, the couple purchased the Stagecoach Inn, a historic property dating from 1747 and spent a year lovingly restoring it.  The Inn was named the best Old-World Style Inn in Hudson Valley Magazine in 2017  and received the Goshen Chamber of Commerce award as the 2017 Business of the Year.  It has also repeatedly won "Diners Choice" recognition from OpenTable

References

Alumni of London Business School
Columbia Business School alumni
Living people
1961 births